Roy H. Leenig (August 22, 1920 – November 8, 1982) was an American basketball player and coach. He was the head coach of Holy Cross from 1955 to 1961. He coached Holy Cross to a 104–48 record and one NCAA tournament appearance, in 1956.  After a successful tenure at Holy Cross, Leenig resigned his position for "compelling personal reasons."

Head coaching record

College

References

1920 births
1982 deaths
American men's basketball coaches
Holy Cross Crusaders men's basketball coaches
High school basketball coaches in the United States
Basketball players from Jersey City, New Jersey
American men's basketball players
Basketball coaches from New Jersey